Ray Bartkus  (born 1961, in Vilnius) is a Lithuanian artist. He graduated from the Vilnius Academy of Art in 1986. He is the designer of the Lithuanian 50 Litas bill.

Since 1991, he has illustrated for a number of publications, including the New York Times Book Review, Harper's Magazine, the Wall Street Journal and Time magazine. Since 2001, he has displayed his personal work in several exhibitions and festivals in the United States and Europe. His works have been acquired by the National Portrait Gallery and the Lithuanian Museum of Art.

He has resided in New York City since 1991.

See also
List of Lithuanian artists
List of Lithuanian painters

References

External links 
Ray Bartkus' personal website
Ray Bartkus' "Really Bad News"

1961 births
Artists from Vilnius
Living people
Vilnius Academy of Arts alumni